The 1899 Puerto Rico census (or Porto Rico as it was then commonly called), was the first national population census held in Porto Rico under U.S. control by the U.S. Census Bureau for the U.S. War Department. It is also the tenth-census combined with the previous censuses taken by Spain. The day used for the census was Friday November 10, 1899. The total population of the island of Puerto Rico was counted as 953,243 - an increase of 154,678 or 16% over the previous 1887 Census taken by the Spanish government.

Population schedule

The population schedule used in the census, translated into English and reduced in size is as follows:
Situation
Street.
Number of house.
Number of house or building in the order of visitation.
Number of family in the order of visitation.
Name of every person residing with this family or in this house
Relationship
Relationship of each person to the head of the family.
Personal description
Color. 
Sex.
Age at last birthday.
Status.
Nativity
Native country of this person.
Citizenship
Cuban, Spaniard, or in suspense.
Occupation
Occupation, trade or profession of every person 10 years of age and over.
Instruction
Months of attendance at school during the last school year.
Can read. (primary)
Can write. (primary)
Higher.
Sanitary conditions
Source of water used.
Disposition of garbage.
Latrine system.

Method of tabulation
It was taken that to save time, the tabulation should be done by machine and not by the old hand-tally system. As the machines invented by Mr Herman Hollerith were successfully used in the earlier eleventh and were to be used for the twelfth U.S. census, it was adopted.

Population and dwellings

Population by municipal districts

Age

Birthplace

The number of foreign-born returned by the census is 13,872 or about 1.5% of the total population. There were few regions in the western hemisphere in which the proportion of natives is so high and that of the foreign-born so low. Of the total number of foreigners 5,935 or 43 per cent were found in the three cities of San Juan, Ponce and Mayagüez. Of the total foreign-born 7,690 or 55 per cent were born in Spain.

Race
With reference to race, the population of Porto Rico is divided by the census into two main classes - those who are and those who are not  White.
The number belonging to each of these classes is as follows:

The colored in the table includes very few (75) Chinese and many persons of mixed white and Black African blood as well as pure Black. Somewhat more than three-fifths of the population of Porto Rico are white and nearly two-fifths are partly or  entirely negro or Black. By the 1899 census five-sixths (83.6 per cent) of the total colored were returned as of mixed blood.

See also

United States Census
Puerto Rican citizenship
Demographics of Puerto Rico
1890 United States Census
1931 Cuba census

References

Puerto Rico
United States census
Puerto Rico
1899 in Puerto Rico
Demographics of Puerto Rico